John Cunningham (born August 9, 1892) was a Negro leagues shortstop and for several years before the founding of the first Negro National League, and in its first season. 

A native of Montgomery, Alabama, Cunningham was the older brother of fellow-Negro leaguer Marion Cunningham. He made his Negro leagues debut in 1912 with the French Lick Plutos, and went on to play for the St. Louis Giants and Dayton Marcos.

References

External links
 and Baseball-Reference Black Baseball stats and Seamheads

Dayton Marcos players
French Lick Plutos players
St. Louis Giants players
1892 births
Year of death missing
Baseball shortstops
Baseball players from Montgomery, Alabama